The Melbourne International Comedy Festival Award, (formerly known as the Barry Award and the Stella Award) is an annual prize presented to the most outstanding comedy act at the Melbourne International Comedy Festival.

History
It has been awarded since 1998, when it was introduced as the Stella Award. It was renamed in 2000 in honour of Barry Humphries, and again renamed in 2019 following comments about transgender people by Humphries. It is generally regarded as the most prestigious award of the festival, and the winner receives a trophy and cash 
prize.

Winners
1998: Linda Haggar and Fahey Younger – Miss Itchy's Crème De Menthe Breakfast Show (Australia)
1999: Sue-Ann Post - G Strings and Jockstraps (Australia)
2000: The Boosh - Arctic Boosh  (UK)
2001: Brian Munich - Brian Munich & Friends (Australia)
2002: Ross Noble  (UK)
2003: Mike Wilmot  (Canada)
2004: Maria Bamford  (USA)
2005: The Drowsy Drivers - Keating! The Opera  (Australia)
2006: Demetri Martin - Dr Earnest Parrot Presents Demetri Martin (USA)
2007: Daniel Kitson - It's the Fireworks Talking  (UK)
2008: Nina Conti - Complete and Utter Conti (UK) and Kristen Schaal - As You Have Probably Never Seen Her Before (USA) (Shared)
2009: The Pajama Men - Versus vs Versus (USA)
2010: Sammy J and Randy (Heath McIvor) - Ricketts Lane (Australia)
2011: Russell Kane - Smokescreens and Castles (UK)
2012: Dr Brown (USA) 
2013: Rich Hall (USA)
2014: Denise Scott - Mother Bare (Australia)
2015: Sam Simmons - Spaghetti for Breakfast (Australia)
2016: Zoe Coombs Marr aka Dave - Trigger Warning (Australia)
2017: Hannah Gadsby - Nanette (Australia)
2018: Sam Campbell - The Trough (Australia)
2019: James Acaster - Cold Lasagne Hate Myself 1999 (UK)
2020: Festival cancelled due to COVID-19 pandemic
2021: Geraldine Hickey - What a Surprise (Australia)

References

External links 
Melbourne International Comedy Festival: Awards Page

Awards established in 1998
Australian comedy awards